Protemblemaria bicirrus, the Warthead blenny, is a species of chaenopsid blenny found in rocky reefs from the Gulf of California to Peru, in the eastern Pacific ocean. It can reach a maximum length of  TL.

References
 Hildebrand, S.F., 1946 (26 Feb.) A descriptive catalog of the shore fishes of Peru. Bulletin of the United States National Museum No. 189: i-xi + 1–530.

bicirrus
Fish described in 1946